Tinseltown: Murder, Morphine, and Madness at the Dawn of Hollywood is a book by William J. Mann published by HarperCollins on 14 October 2014. It won the Edgar Award for Best Fact Crime in 2015.

References

External links 
 Book review on The Washington Post
 As listed on Barnes & Noble

American non-fiction books
Non-fiction crime books
Edgar Award-winning works
2014 non-fiction books
HarperCollins books